McCombs is a surname. Notable people with the surname include:

 Cal McCombs (b. 1945), American football player and coach
 Cass McCombs (b. 1977), American musician
 Davis McCombs (b. 1969), American poet
 Doug McCombs (b. 1962), American musician
 Elizabeth McCombs (1872–1935), New Zealand politician
 Holland McCombs (1901–1991), American journalist
 James McCombs (1873–1933), New Zealand politician
 Red McCombs (1927–2023), American businessman
 Ryan McCombs (b. 1974), American musician
 Terry McCombs (1905–1982), New Zealand politician
 W. Eugene McCombs (1925–2004), American politician
 William F. McCombs (1876–1921), American lawyer and political operative

See also
 Red McCombs Media
 Red and Charline McCombs Field, softball field at The University of Texas at Austin
 McCombs School of Business, business school at The University of Texas at Austin